The 1932–33 Drexel Dragons men's basketball team represented Drexel Institute of Art, Science and Industry during the 1932–33 men's basketball season. The Dragons, led by 6th year head coach Walter Halas, played their home games at Curtis Hall Gym and were members of the Eastern Pennsylvania Collegiate Basketball League (EPCBL).

Roster

Schedule

|-
!colspan=9 style="background:#F8B800; color:#002663;"| Regular season
|-

References

Drexel Dragons men's basketball seasons
Drexel
Drexel Dragons Men's Basketball
Drexel Dragons Men's Basketball